Tribulus cistoides, also called wanglo (in Aruba), the Jamaican feverplant or puncture vine, is a species of flowering plant in the family Zygophyllaceae, which is widely distributed in tropical and subtropical regions.

Habitat
Tribulus Cistoides, known locally in Mexico as “Abrojo de tierra caliente” (thistle of the hot country), grows in Central, South, and the southern part of North America.  It survives well in arid low land close to the shore and where these is sand or loose soil is present. This is also why it may survive in urban environments in or by the gutters of roads, as there may be loose soil nearby.

References

Plants described in 1753
Taxa named by Carl Linnaeus
Flora of Mexico
cistoides
Flora of the Coral Sea Islands Territory